MMJ may refer to:
Medical marijuana, cannabis prescribed by physicians for their patients
, Filipino singing duo
Modified Modular Jack, a six-pin  modular connector used by Digital Equipment Corporation on their computers and peripherals.
Moscow Mathematical Journal, a quarterly international academic journal published by the Independent University of Moscow
My Morning Jacket, an American rock band
The IATA airport code of Matsumoto Airport in Matsumoto, Nagano Prefecture, Japan
The ISO 639-3 identifier code for the Majhwar language